Rafael Castillo Valdez (15 January 1928 – 17 March 2015) was a Guatemalan politician. He served as a member of the Congress of Guatemala.  After this he served as Guatemala's ambassador to the United Nations in the mid-1970s.  He then served as President of Congress.

Castillo also served as Guatemala's foreign minister from 1978 to 1982. During this time he often dominated the government. Many people viewed Castillo as a supporter of hardline tactics in Guatemala's Civil War. Castillo was a member of the Church of Jesus Christ of Latter-day Saints.

References

Ted E. Brewerton, “A Conversation about the Church in Central America,” Ensign, February 1992, pp. 78–79
“Church Member Nominated Ambassador to Finland,” Ensign, March 1975 p. 78

1928 births
2015 deaths
Guatemalan Latter Day Saints
Members of the Congress of Guatemala
Presidents of the Congress of Guatemala
Foreign ministers of Guatemala
Permanent Representatives of Guatemala to the United Nations